Carbon is a ghost town in Carbon County, Wyoming, United States. The Carbon Cemetery, which is listed on the National Register of Historic Places, is located in Carbon.

References

Unincorporated communities in Wyoming
Unincorporated communities in Carbon County, Wyoming
Ghost towns in Wyoming